Sripali Shiromala Weerakkody (born 7 January 1986) is a Sri Lankan cricketer who played in 89 Women's One Day Internationals and 58 Women's Twenty20 Internationals. On 20 August 2007, she broke the record for the highest score in Women's List-A cricket, while scoring 271* for Kandyan Ladies Cricket Club against Pushpadana Ladies. She played as a medium-pace bowler. Weerakkody was member of the 2014 Asian Games bronze medal-winning team.

In October 2018, she was named in Sri Lanka's squad for the 2018 ICC Women's World Twenty20 tournament in the West Indies. In July 2020, she announced her retirement from international cricket.

References

1986 births
Living people
Asian Games medalists in cricket
Cricketers at the 2014 Asian Games
Asian Games bronze medalists for Sri Lanka
Medalists at the 2014 Asian Games
Sri Lankan women cricketers
Sri Lanka women Twenty20 International cricketers